Oribe Canales (September 13, 1956 – 17 December 2018), known professionally as Oribe, was a Cuban-born American hairstylist. His name is pronounced oh-REE-beh, because it is a Spanish name, but the brand is pronounced or-BAY, because when he moved to the US, people in his hometown couldn't say it properly and the mispronunciation stuck.

Early life 
Oribe was born in Jaruco, Cuba, on September 13, 1956, and emigrated to the United States with his family in 1962. They settled in Charlotte, North Carolina.

Career 
In 1976, Oribe moved to New York City. It was while working at the Garren at the Plaza salon that Oribe received his first editorial credit, from the magazine GQ. He then started working with photographer Steven Meisel and makeup artist François Nars. In 1987, Oribe established his first salon in New York City's Upper West Side. In 1990, he opened a salon on the 10th floor of the Elizabeth Arden salon, on Fifth Avenue in New York City, after having been introduced to the cosmetics company by the model Vendela.

Oribe styled models' hair at fashion shows for fashion houses such as Versace, Thierry Mugler, Calvin Klein, and Chanel. He was also known for having given a new look to supermodels such as Linda Evangelista and Cindy Crawford.

He died on 17 December 2018, aged 62.

References

External links 

American hairdressers
Cuban emigrants to the United States
Businesspeople from New York City
1956 births
2018 deaths
20th-century American businesspeople